Seyyed Abbas or Seyyedabbas may refer to:
 Seyyed Abbas, Kermanshah
 Seyyed Abbas, Khuzestan
 Seyyed Abbas, Lorestan
 Seyyed Abbas, West Azerbaijan
 Seyyed Abbas Rural District, in Khuzestan Province